Stefano Torelli (1712–1784) was an Italian painter. He was born in Bologna. He studied first under his father, Felice Torelli, and then under Francesco Solimena. The future King of Poland, Augustus III, brought him to Dresden in 1740, where he painted altar-pieces and ceiling decorations, many destroyed in the Seven Years' War. He painted figures in Canaletto's twenty-nine views of Dresden (1741). In 1762 he was summoned to the Russian court where he painted ceilings in the Royal Palace, and some portraits, among the latter one of the Empress Elizabeth in armor. He was a clever caricaturist, and etched a few plates. He died in St. Petersburg.

Gallery

References

1712 births
1784 deaths
18th-century Italian painters
Italian male painters
Italian etchers
Painters from Bologna
18th-century Italian male artists